Kanton is a rural locality (a village) in Novoberdyashsky Selsoviet, Karaidelsky District, Bashkortostan, Russia. The population was 151 as of 2010. There are 4 streets.

Geography 
Kanton is located 43 km southeast of Karaidel (the district's administrative centre) by road. Novy Berdyash is the nearest rural locality.

References 

Rural localities in Karaidelsky District